Baileya dormitans, the sleeping baileya, is a nolid moth (family Nolidae). The species was first described by Achille Guenée in 1852. It is found in North America.

The MONA or Hodges number for Baileya dormitans is 8971.

References

Further reading

 
 
 

Nolidae
Articles created by Qbugbot
Moths described in 1852